The Chiba Zoological Park is located in Chiba Prefecture, east of Tokyo, Japan, and near the shore of Tokyo Bay. The park can be accessed by the Chiba Monorail and is open between 9:30am and 4:30pm.

Animals

Overview 
The Chiba Zoological Park opened its doors for the first time in April 1985, and now includes seven different areas.

Zoological Hall  
Easy to access from the main gate, usually the first one to be visited by tourists. This area hosts the pavillon houses where the information desk is located. The Zoological Hall focuses on various species from the tropical rainforest such as nocturnal animals, marmosets, tropical birds and the most famous one of the area: the two-toed sloth.

The small animals zone  
Home of the zoo mascot, Futa the red panda.  He became a TV celebrity in 2005.
This area also hosts other red pandas called Chichi, Meimei, Meita, Kuta, Mai, Mii, and Genta.

Steppe Zone 
This has big herbivores on display, such as elephants, giraffes, and zebras, but also has South African cranes, ostriches and meerkats.

Children's Zoo 
This area was designed to stimulate a visitor's interest in wildlife by getting in direct contact with animals such as goat and sheep.
This area also hosts horses, capybara, and penguins from Peru and Chile.
In this area an explanation of the zookeeper routine also allows the visitors to get a good understanding of what it takes to take care of the animals in the Park.

Monkey Zone 
As indicated by the name, this area is essentially focused on primates such as lemurs and mandrills, as well as several other species.

Ancestors of Domestic Animals Zone 
In this area, animals such as bisons are hosted and depending on the seasons there can be different ones present (such as reindeers during Christmas time).

Avian an Aquatic Zone 
The Sea lions are the main attraction of this area, but other interesting species such as the Shoe-billed Stork are present and attracting a lot of visitors.

External links 
 http://en.japantravel.com/chiba/chiba-zoological-park/17914
 http://www.city.chiba.jp/zoo/

Zoos in Japan
Chiba Prefecture